Brad William Benson (born November 25, 1955 in Altoona, Pennsylvania) is a former professional American football player. He was an offensive lineman with the New York Giants of the National Football League from 1978 to 1988 and was a pivotal member of the 1986 Giants team that defeated the Denver Broncos in Super Bowl XXI.  Benson was selected to play in the 1986 Pro Bowl.

Benson played college football at Penn State University from 1974 to 1976 and attended Altoona Area High School. He was drafted by the New England Patriots in the eighth round of the 1977 NFL Draft but never played for the team. He resides in Flemington, New Jersey.

After his retirement, Benson became a businessman and began selling cars. He previously operated the Brad Benson Auto Group in South Brunswick, New Jersey, selling Hyundais and Mitsubishis. For years, Benson has appeared in various television and radio commercials for his business, including an ad that featured Lawrence Taylor and another that parodied former New York governor Eliot Spitzer. Another commercial saw Benson talk about a goalpost he purchased from the original Giants Stadium, which he refers to as his "40-foot erection".

In another commercial, in the middle of the 2010 Qur'an-burning controversy, he offered a free car to the man behind the controversy, Terry Jones, if he went back on his threat. Jones reconsidered and he collected the new car from Benson and donated it to a charity."

Benson and his family have lived on a  farm in Hillsborough Township, New Jersey. His younger brother Troy Benson played for the New York Jets from 1985 to 1990. On March 17, 2013, Benson's son Clinton was accused of hitting Flemington's Richard Lachner with his Nissan Frontier pickup at around 3 a.m.  on Woodfern Road in Branchburg by the historic Neshanic Inn. Clinton Benson had entered an open guilty plea on Feb. 1, 2016, to third-degree assault by auto, fourth-degree possession of hollow-point bullets, possession of drug paraphernalia and several motor-vehicle offenses.

See also
History of the New York Giants (1979-1993)

References

External links
Brad Benson Auto Group

1955 births
Living people
American automobile salespeople
American football offensive linemen
Players of American football from Pennsylvania
National Conference Pro Bowl players
New York Giants players
Penn State Nittany Lions football players
Sportspeople from Altoona, Pennsylvania
People from Flemington, New Jersey
People from Hillsborough Township, New Jersey